Walter Benet  was the Archdeacon of Wilts from his collation on 7 March 1610 until his death on 30 July 1614.

From Somerset, he was educated at New College, Oxford. He held livings at Little Wittenham and Minety.

References

17th-century English Anglican priests
Alumni of New College, Oxford
Archdeacons of Wilts
1614 deaths